Shakopee Creek is a  tributary of the Chippewa River of Minnesota, United States. It is part of the Minnesota River drainage basin, flowing to the Mississippi River. It rises in Kandiyohi County at the outlet of Andrew Lake, with its major headwaters being an outlet from Games Lake about 7 miles (11 km) west northwest of New London. From Andrew it flows westerly into Swift County, where it passes near Kerkhoven.

Shakopee is derived from the Sioux-language word meaning "six".

See also
List of rivers of Minnesota

References

External links
Minnesota Watersheds
USGS Hydrologic Unit Map - State of Minnesota (1974)

Rivers of Minnesota
Tributaries of the Mississippi River
Rivers of Kandiyohi County, Minnesota
Rivers of Swift County, Minnesota
Rivers of Chippewa County, Minnesota